The Elan d'or Award for Newcomer of the Year is an award given at the Elan d'or Awards in Japan. This award is given to the person who is considered to be the most promising actor through the year.

References

External links
 

Awards established in 1956
Japanese film awards
Recurring events established in 1956
1956 establishments in Japan
Lists of films by award
Awards for young actors